Augusta Lynn Bolles (born 1949) is an anthropologist, professor of women's studies at the University of Maryland, and co-chair of The Cottagers' African American Cultural Festival.

Biography
She graduated from Syracuse University and earned a master's degree in sociocultural anthropology and a doctoral degree in anthropology from Rutgers University. She is the daughter of Augusta Beebe Bolles and George Bolles. She married James Mackin Walsh on February 9, 1980, in the Kirkpatrick Chapel of Rutgers University in New Brunswick, New Jersey.

She is the author of We Paid Our Dues: Women Trade Union Leaders in the Caribbean (1996) and Sister Jamaica: A Study of Women, Work and Households in Kingston (1996). She co-authored In the Shadows of the Sun: Caribbean Development Alternatives and U.S. Policy (1990) and My Mother Who Fathered Me and Others: Gender and Kinship in the English-Speaking Caribbean (1988). She served as president of the Association of Black Anthropologists (1983–84), the Caribbean Studies Association (1997–98), the Association for Feminist Anthropology (2001-2003), and the Society for the Anthropology of North America (2009-2011).

References

External links 
 A. Lynn Bolles papers at the University of Maryland Libraries

1949 births
Living people
American women anthropologists
Syracuse University alumni
Rutgers University alumni
University of Maryland, College Park faculty
21st-century American women